The 2021 Ghanaian FA Cup (also called the 2021 MTN FA Cup for sponsorship reasons) is the 41st edition of the Ghanaian FA Cup, the knockout football competition of Ghana.

History 
Due to the shortcomings within the Ghana Football Association due to the dissolution of the GFA in June 2018, as a result of the Anas Number 12 Expose and the COVID-19 pandemic, the FA Cup has not been fully organised until 2021. From 2019 to 2021, Wilson Arthur was the chairman of the FA Cup committee, tasked to ensure a successful organization of the Cup competition.

Format 
A total of 110 clubs consisting of 18 Premier League Clubs, 48 Division One League Clubs and 44 Division Two League Clubs from the Regional Football Associations will participate in this year's competition.

The preliminary round stage of the cup would be played between the 48 Division One Clubs and 44 Division Two clubs totalling 92 clubs across the country.

The Preliminary stage of the competition is scheduled for 14 May to 20 May 2021. The Winners of the preliminary round will progress to the round of 64 where they would be drawn against the 18 Premier League clubs.

The Winner of the MTN FA Cup shall represent Ghana in the 2021–22 CAF Confederation Cup.

Preliminary round 
The draw for the preliminary round was made on 4 May 2021.

Round of 64
The live draw for the 2020/21 MTN FA Cup Round of 64 was held live on Max TV on 20 May 2021.

Round of 32
The draw for the MTN FA Cup Round of 32  was held on Thursday at the MTN House in Accra.

The colourful event was attended by competition sponsors MTN, broadcast sponsors StarTimes and officials of the GFA.

The 32 teams comprised eleven (11) Premier League clubs, twelve (12) Division One clubs and nine (9) Division Two teams who progressed from the Round of 64 stage.

Round of 16 
The draw for the MTN FA Cup Round of 16 stage was held on 29 June 2021. 

This round involved nine teams from the Ghana Premier League (level 1), five teams from the Ghana Division One League (level 2) and two teams from Ghana Division Two League (level 3).

Quarter-finals 
The draw for the MTN FA Cup Quarter finals stage was held on 15 July 2021 in the studio of StarTimes Adepa channel 247 and Max TV in Accra at 3pm and broadcast live on MAX TV.

The round featured six teams from the Ghana Premier League (level 1) and two teams from the Ghana Division Two League (level 3).

Semi-finals 
The four winners from the quarter-finals played two ties played on 1 August 2021. Both games were played at the Cape Coast Sports Stadium

Final

See also 

 2020–21 Ghana Premier League
2021 Ghana Women's FA Cup

References

External links 

 

Football competitions in Ghana
2021 in Ghanaian sport
2020–21 African domestic association football cups
 Ghanaian FA Cup
2020–21 in Ghanaian football